María Guadalupe Morales Rubio (born 11 March 1966) is a Mexican politician affiliated with the Party of the Democratic Revolution (formerly to the National Action Party). As of 2014 she served as Deputy of the LIX Legislature of the Mexican Congress representing the Federal District.

References

1966 births
Living people
People from Mexico City
Women members of the Chamber of Deputies (Mexico)
National Action Party (Mexico) politicians
Party of the Democratic Revolution politicians
Deputies of the LIX Legislature of Mexico
Members of the Chamber of Deputies (Mexico) for Mexico City